Ian Gough (born 10 November 1976) is a former Wales international rugby union rugby player. His usual position was lock forward. He made his debut for the Wales national rugby union team against South Africa in 1998, and was a regular thereafter, including playing in the 2006 Six Nations Championship, and the mid year series against Argentina. He also played within the Irish under-19 international team.

On 18 January 2010 he was named in the 35 man Wales national Squad for the 2010 Six Nations tournament.

He retired from professional rugby 5 September 2013, only to be tempted back with the opportunity to play for London Irish in the Aviva Premiership. In May 2014 Gough rejoined Newport Gwent Dragons. He announced his retirement from playing in May 2015.

Personal
In March 2015 Gough was cleared on appeal of assaulting his ex-girlfriend, Welsh glamour model Sophia Cahill.

References

External links
IanGough.com Official Website
Ospreys profile
Wales profile
 Ian Gough on WRU.co.uk
 Ian Gough on newportgwentdragons.com

1976 births
Living people
Dragons RFC players
London Irish players
Newport RFC players
Ospreys (rugby union) players
Pontypridd RFC players
Rugby union locks
Rugby union players from Panteg
Wales international rugby union players
Welsh rugby union players